The Embassy of Ukraine in Copenhagen is the diplomatic mission of Ukraine in the Kingdom of Denmark.

History 
Following independence, Ukraine August 24, 1991 Denmark recognized Ukraine on December 31, 1991. On February 12, 1992,  diplomatic relations were established between Ukraine and Denmark. From 1993 to 2004, the Ukrainian diplomatic mission in Copenhagen provided ambassadors concurrently. On April 7, 2005 the first Ambassador of Ukraine Natalia Zarudna with residence in Copenhagen, presented his credentials to Queen  Margrethe II.

Previous Ambassadors
 Dmytro Levytsky (1919-1921)
 Kostyantyn Mashiko (1992-1995), Ambassador
 Olexiy Rybak (1995-1997), Chargé d'Affaires ad interim
 Vasyl Yakovenko (1997), Chargé d'Affaires ad interim
 Igor Podoliev (1997-1999), Ambassador
 Olexandr Slipchenko (1999-2002), Ambassador
 Natalia Zarudna (2004-2008), Ambassador
 Olena Polunina (2008-2009), Chargé d'Affaires ad interim
 Pavlo Riabikin (2009-2010), Ambassador
 Mykhailo Skuratovskyi (2010-2014), Ambassador
 Mykhailo Vydoinyk (2018 - ), Ambassador

See also 
 Ukraine–Denmark relations
 Foreign relations of Denmark
 Foreign relations of Ukraine
 Embassy of Denmark in Kyiv
 Diplomatic missions of Ukraine

References

External links 
 Embassy of Ukraine in Copenhagen 

Copenhagen
Ukraine
Embassy